Tešanj is a town and municipality located in the Zenica-Doboj Canton of the Federation of Bosnia and Herzegovina, an entity of Bosnia and Herzegovina. As of 2013, it has a population of 43,063 inhabitants, while the town of Tešanj has a population of 5,257 inhabitants. It is situated in the northern part of Bosnia and Herzegovina.

Geography
Tešanj is located at an altitude of 230 meters and developed around the river Tešanjka. The town is surrounded by many hills.

History
The present name of the city was mentioned for the first time in 1461 in a charter from King Stephen Tomašević to his uncle Radivoj. The charter stated that King Stephen Tomašević grants him, among other possessions "i na Usori grad Tešanj -- the city of Tešanj, in the Usora region".

Between the second half of the 15th century and the first half of the 16th century, the history of Tešanj was rather chaotic. Since Bosnia was considered a buffer state by the Ottomans, it changed rulers quite often, alternating between Ottoman and Hungarian occupation. Between 1463 and 1476 Tešanj was the center of the Bosnian Kingdom and the residence of Duke Radivoj Kotromanić.

From 1512 (or 1520-21) on, Tešanj was under continuous rule of the Ottoman Empire. The most Ottoman influential ruler of Tešanj was the Bosnian Sandžak-bey Gazi Ferhad Pasha. It was under his authority that the city rapidly developed. His most significant contribution was the Ferhadija Mosque (1563), which still stands in the old town, dating back to the 16th century. Gazi Ferhad-bey died in 1568 and was buried in the yard of the mosque. The epitaph on his tombstone was in Arabic, and is the oldest Islamic record in Tešanj.

The old Eminagić House is the oldest house in Tešanj, still standing the test of time, and is said to have been built at the end of the 17th century.

The Old Town is dominated by the well-preserved fortress, called "Gradina" or simply Tešanj Castle, that overlooks the entire city. The Upper City Center expands around the castle, rather on the bottom of this castle. Very early this castle became a center of economic and cultural life of Tešanj. This was developed along with retail and trade in Tešanj. The city center developed rapidly in the 17th and 18th century, when there were around 40 stores and trades operating.

The clock tower was built in the 17th century. Out of a total of 21 clock towers that were built throughout Bosnia and Herzegovina, this tower is one of four that are still working properly. It is 18.5 meters tall. Up until 1890 this tower showed alaturk time, but the same year Fehim-beg Smailbegović brought a new clock which showed European time. This hour clock is still working.

The grave of the poet Musa Ćazim Ćatić is located in "Obješenica" cemetery in the city center. Even though he was born in Odžak in 1880, he dedicated his whole life and work to the city Tešanj, where he died in 1915.

From 1929 to 1941, Tešanj was part of the Vrbas Banovina of the Kingdom of Yugoslavia.

Tourism

Tešanj Castle

The foundation of this fortification was started even before the Romans conquered the region. Exact dates are unknown. It was later enhanced by the Romans, Slavs and the Ottoman forces. It has been primarily a defensive fortification. Tešanj Castle is one of the most significant and biggest castles in Bosnia, with an area of about 6,296 square metres.

During the Ottoman period, the castle had a permanent army.

Demographics

Population

Ethnic composition 

The town of Tešanj itself had 5,253 residents in 1981, and 6,058 in 1991. Note: Bosniaks are Bosnian nationals with Muslim religious and/or cultural background.

Places in the municipality
Bukva, Blaževci, Bobare, Cerovac, Čaglici, Čifluk, Dobropolje, Drinčići, Džemilić Planje, Jevadžije, Jelah, Jablanica, Jelah Polje, Kalošević, Karadaglije, Koprivci, Kraševo, Lepenica, Logobare, Lončari, Ljetinić, Marin Han, Mrkotić, Miljanovci, Medakovo, Mekiš, Novo Selo, Novi Miljanovci, Orašje Planje, Piljužići, Potočani, Putešić, Raduša, Rosulje, Ripna, Šije, Tešanj, Trepče, Tešanjka, Tugovići, Vrela, Vukovo, Hrvatinovići, and Dubalji.

Notable people
 Nisim Albahari (1916-1991), Yugoslav partisan
 Enis Bešlagić (born 1975), Bosnian actor
 Musa Ćazim Ćatić (1878-1915), Bosnian poet
 Alma Hasanić Grizović (born 1989), Bosnian-Norwegian handball player
 Numan Kurdić (born 1999), Bosnian footballer
 Otto Lang (1908-2006), Bosnian-American film producer
 Admir Ljevaković (born 1984), Bosnian footballer
 Ademaga Mešić (1868-1945), Ustaša Deputy-Leader
 Jasmin Muharemović (born 1965), Bosnian pop-folk singer
 Ajdin Mujagić (born 1998), Bosnian footballer
 Damat Ibrahim Pasha (1517-1601), Ottoman statesman
 Esad Plavi (born 1965), Bosnian pop-folk singer
 Sanela Redžić, Bosnian disabled athlete
 Edin Šaranović (1976-2021), Bosnian footballer
 Anid Travančić (born 1993), Bosnian footballer
 Avdija Vršajević (born 1986), Bosnian footballer

References

External links

 

 
Cities and towns in the Federation of Bosnia and Herzegovina
Populated places in Tešanj
Municipalities of Zenica-Doboj Canton